Erepta stylodon is a species of air-breathing land snail, a terrestrial pulmonate gastropod mollusk in the family Helicarionidae. This species is endemic to Mauritius.

References

Helicarionidae
Gastropods described in 1842
Taxonomy articles created by Polbot
Endemic fauna of Mauritius